The 1965–66 Liga Femenina de Baloncesto was the 3rd edition of the Spanish premier women's basketball championship. It took place from 5 December to 24 April 1966. Eleven teams took part in the championship and Medina La Coruña won its first title. Zaragoza and Medina Madrid were relegated after losing the promotion league with Standard Madrid. Alhamar Granada renounced at the end of the season.

First round

Group A

Group B

Finals

References
Hispaligas

External links
Official website

Femenina
Liga Femenina de Baloncesto seasons
Spain
Spain